Teruo Nakamura (born 19 February 1952) is a Japanese professional golfer.

Nakamura played on the Japan Golf Tour, winning three times.

Professional wins (3)

Japan Golf Tour wins (3)

External links

References

Japanese male golfers
Japan Golf Tour golfers
Sportspeople from Tokyo
1952 births
Living people